Aduman is a town in the Ashanti Region of Ghana. It is located in the Afigya-Kwabre District of Ghana. The town is known for the Aduman School. The school is a second cycle institution. The major occupation is Agriculture. It is about 15 km away from the Capital of Ashanti, and 3 km away from the District Capital. About 98% of the population are Christians. The remaining 2% form other religions.

References

Populated places in the Ashanti Region